Friedrich Martin Berwerth (16 November 1850, Schäßburg – 22 September 1918, Vienna) was an Austrian mineralogist and petrographer known for his work with meteorites.

He was a student at the Universities of Vienna, Graz and Heidelberg, and following graduation, worked as an assistant to Gustav Tschermak von Seysenegg at the Mineralogisch-Petrographischen Institut in Vienna (1874). Later the same year, he began work as an assistant at the Imperial Hofmineralien Cabinet. In 1888 he became a curator, followed by titles of leiter (1895) and director (1904) of the mineralogy-petrography department.

From 1888 he was a privat-docent of petrography at the University of Vienna, where in 1894, he became an associate professor, and in 1907, attained a full professorship. In 1901, with August von Loehr, he founded the Wiener Mineralogische Gesellschaft (in 1947 the name of the association was changed to Österreichische Mineralogische Gesellschaft).

Written works 
 Mikroskopische Structurbilder der Massengesteine in farbigen Lithographien, 1900.
 Verzeichnis der Meteoriten im K.K. Naturhistorischen Hofmuseum Ende Oktober 1902, (1903).
 "Steel and Meteoric Iron, &c", published in 1908 in English. 
 Ein natürliches System der Eisenmeteoriten, 1914.
 "On the origin of meteorites", published in 1917 in English (Translation from German of a lecture given in the Scientific club of Vienna on 26 January 1914).

References 

1850 births
1918 deaths
People from Sighișoara
Austrian mineralogists
Academic staff of the University of Vienna